George Gibbs may refer to:

Politics
 George Gibbs (Australian politician) (1908–1968), member of the Victorian Parliament
 George Gibbs, 1st Baron Wraxall (1873–1931), British member of parliament and peer
 George Gibbs, 2nd Baron Wraxall (1928–2001), British peer and kidnapping victim

Science
 George Gibbs (ethnologist) (1815–1873), American ethnologist, naturalist and geologist 
 George Gibbs (mineralogist) (1776–1833), American mineralogist
 George James Gibbs (1866–1947), British astronomer and engineer
 George Gibbs (gunmaker) (died 1884), English gunmaker and founder of George Gibbs Ltd., the maker of the .505 Gibbs cartridge

Sports
 George Gibbs (Australian footballer) (1905–1987), for Fitzroy and Collingwood
 George Gibbs (footballer, born 1953), English

Other
 George Gibbs, one of the main characters in the 1938 Thornton Wilder play Our Town
 George F. Gibbs (1846–1924), secretary to the First Presidency of The Church of Jesus Christ of Latter-day Saints
 George Fort Gibbs (1870–1942), American writer and illustrator for The Saturday Evening Post
 George Sabin Gibbs (1875–1947), American general
 George Couper Gibbs (1879–1946), Florida Attorney General and circuit court judge
 George W. Gibbs Jr. (1916–2000), sailor in the United States Navy
 George Gibbs (priest), Archdeacon of Saint Kitts
 George Gibbs (special effects artist) (died 2020), film special effects artist

See also
 George Gibb (transport administrator) (1850–1925), transport administrator
 George Gibb (footballer) (1891–1917), Scottish footballer
 George Gibbs Dibrell (1822–1888), member of the United States House of Representatives